In geometry, the Waterman polyhedra are a family of polyhedra discovered around 1990 by the mathematician Steve Waterman. A Waterman polyhedron is created by packing spheres according to the cubic close(st) packing (CCP), also known as the face-centered cubic (fcc) packing, then sweeping away the spheres that are farther from the center than a defined radius, then creating the convex hull of the sphere centers.

Waterman polyhedra form a vast family of polyhedra. Some of them have a number of nice properties such as multiple symmetries, or interesting and regular shapes. Others are just a collection of faces formed from irregular convex polygons.

The most popular Waterman polyhedra are those with centers at the point (0,0,0) and built out of hundreds of polygons. Such polyhedra resemble spheres. In fact, the more faces a Waterman polyhedron has, the more it resembles its circumscribed sphere in volume and total area.

With each point of 3D space we can associate a family of Waterman polyhedra with different values of radii of the circumscribed spheres. Therefore, from a mathematical point of view we can consider Waterman polyhedra as 4D spaces W(x, y, z, r), where x, y, z are coordinates of a point in 3D, and r is a positive number greater than 1.

Seven origins of cubic close(st) packing (CCP)

There can be seven origins defined in CCP, where n = {1, 2, 3, …}:
 Origin 1: offset 0,0,0, radius 
 Origin 2: offset ,,0, radius 
 Origin 3: offset ,,, radius 
 Origin 3*: offset ,,, radius 
 Origin 4: offset ,,, radius 
 Origin 5: offset 0,0,, radius 
 Origin 6: offset 1,0,0, radius 

Depending on the origin of the sweeping, a different shape and resulting polyhedron are obtained.

Relation to Platonic and Archimedean solids

Some Waterman polyhedra create Platonic solids and Archimedean solids. For this comparison of Waterman polyhedra they are normalized, e.g.  has a different size or volume than  but has the same form as an octahedron.

Platonic solids
Tetrahedron: W1 O3*, W2 O3*, W1 O3, W1 O4
Octahedron: W2 O1, W1 O6
Cube: W2 O6
Icosahedron and dodecahedron have no representation as Waterman polyhedra.

Archimedean solids
Cuboctahedron: W1 O1, W4 O1
Truncated octahedron: W10 O1
Truncated tetrahedron: W4 O3, W2 O4
The other Archimedean solids have no representation as Waterman polyhedra.

The W7 O1 might be mistaken for a truncated cuboctahedron, as well W3 O1 = W12 O1 mistaken for a rhombicuboctahedron, but those Waterman polyhedra have two edge lengths and therefore do not qualify as Archimedean solids.

Generalized Waterman polyhedra
Generalized Waterman polyhedra are defined as the convex hull derived from the point set of any spherical extraction from a regular lattice.

Included is a detailed analysis of the following 10 lattices – bcc, cuboctahedron, diamond, fcc, hcp, truncated octahedron, rhombic dodecahedron, simple cubic, truncated tet tet, truncated tet truncated octahedron cuboctahedron.

Each of the 10 lattices were examined to isolate those particular origin points that manifested a unique polyhedron, as well as possessing some minimal symmetry requirement. From a viable origin point, within a lattice, there exists an unlimited series of polyhedra. Given its proper sweep interval, then there is a one-to-one correspondence between each integer value and a generalized Waterman polyhedron.

Notes

External links
Steve Waterman's Homepage
Waterman Polyhedra Java applet by Mark Newbold
Maurice Starck's write-up
  hand-made models by Magnus Wenninger
 write-up by Paul Bourke
 on-line generator by Paul Bourke
 program to make Waterman polyhedron by Adrian Rossiter in Antiprism
Waterman projection and write up by Carlos Furiti
rotating globe by Izidor Hafner
real time winds and temperature on Waterman projection by Cameron Beccario
Solar Termination (Waterman) by Mike Bostock
interactive Waterman butterfly map by Jason Davies
write-up by Maurice Starck
first 1000 Waterman polyhedra and sphere clusters by Nemo Thorx

Steve Waterman's Waterman polyhedron (WP)
 Generalized Waterman polyhedron by Ed Pegg jr of Wolfram
 various Waterman sphere clusters by Ed Pegg jr of Wolfram
 app to make 4d waterman polyhedron in Great Stella by Rob Webb
  Waterman polyhedron app in Matlab needs a workaround as shown on the following reference page
  Waterman polyhedron in Mupad

Polyhedra